In My Father's Garden is a 2016 Dutch drama film directed by Ben Sombogaart. It was based on the book of the same name by Jan Siebelink. It was listed as one of eleven films that could be selected as the Dutch submission for the Best Foreign Language Film at the 89th Academy Awards, but it was not nominated.

Cast
 Gaite Jansen as Johanna
 Barry Atsma as Hans Sievez
 Marcel Hensema as Jozef Mieras
 Noortje Herlaar as Margje

References

External links
 

2016 films
2016 drama films
Dutch drama films
2010s Dutch-language films
Films directed by Ben Sombogaart